Top Frontier Investment Holdings, Inc. is a Philippine holding company based in Makati, Metro Manila. Through two primary holdings, the company is active in mining, packaging, real estate, food and beverage. In 2017, the company was ranked 1228th on the Forbes Global 2000. The company was incorporated on March 11, 2008 with Iñigo U. Zóbel as chairman. The company went public in 2014.

Holdings 
 San Miguel Corporation - 66%
 Clariden Holdings, Inc. - 100%

References 

Financial services companies established in 2008
Holding companies of the Philippines
Companies listed on the Philippine Stock Exchange
Companies based in Makati
Philippine companies established in 2008
Holding companies established in 2008